Clinton Wayne Zavaras (born January 4, 1967) is a Greek American former professional baseball pitcher. He appeared in 10 games in Major League Baseball (MLB) for the Seattle Mariners during the 1989 season.

Career
Zavaras was picked in the third round of the 1985  MLB draft. On June 3, 1989, he made his  MLB debut against Hall of Famer Nolan Ryan and the Texas Rangers. Zavaras took the loss in the game, giving up 3 runs in the 8th inning, while Ryan threw a one-hitter for a 6–1 victory.

Zavaras, who is of Greek descent, was selected to play for the Greek national baseball team in the 2004 Olympic Games in Athens, Greece. He owns and operates a baseball school in Lakewood, Colorado.

Notes

External links

1967 births
Living people
American expatriate baseball players in Canada
American people of Greek descent
Baseball players at the 2004 Summer Olympics
Baseball players from Denver
Bellingham Mariners players
Calgary Cannons players
Colorado Springs Sky Sox players
Jacksonville Suns players
Major League Baseball pitchers
Olympic baseball players of Greece
Salinas Spurs players
San Bernardino Spirit players
Seattle Mariners players
Vermont Mariners players
Wausau Timbers players